The World Group Play-offs were the main play-offs of 2009 Davis Cup. Winners advanced to the World Group, and loser were relegated in the Zonal Regions I.

Teams
Bold indicates team has qualified for the 2012 Davis Cup World Group.

 From World Group

 From Americas Group I

 From Asia/Oceania Group I

 From Europe/Africa Group I

Results

Seeded teams
 
 
 
 
 
 
 
 

Unseeded teams

 
 
 
 
 
  
 
 

Playoff results

Chile vs. Austria

Belgium vs. Ukraine

Brazil vs. Ecuador

Netherlands vs. France

South Africa vs. India

Serbia vs. Uzbekistan

Sweden vs. Romania

Italy vs. Switzerland

References

World Group Play-offs